The Chief Looking's Village site (32BL3) is a historic archeological site on the east side of Pioneer Park in Bismarck, North Dakota that was listed in the National Register of Historic Places in 1978.  It has also been known as Ward Earth Lodge Village.  It was listed on the National Register of Historic Places in 1978.

It is a Mandan village site that, as of its NRHP listing, had never been severely vandalized or disrupted by archeological excavations, so it remained valuable for the information potential that it held.

See also
Double Ditch Earth Lodge Village Site (32BL8)

Further reading
Wood, W. Raymond.  "Notes on a Burned Earth Lodge at the Ward Site, North Dakota".  Plains Anthropologist 8 (1957): 41–42.

References

Archaeological sites on the National Register of Historic Places in North Dakota
National Register of Historic Places in Bismarck, North Dakota
Mandan, Hidatsa, and Arikara Nation
Native American history of North Dakota